Nobi were members of the slave class during the Korean dynasties of Goryeo and Joseon. Legally, they held the lowest rank in medieval Korean society. Like the slaves, serfs, and indentured servants of the Western Hemisphere, nobi were considered property or chattel, and could be bought, sold, or gifted.

Classification
The nobi were socially indistinct from freemen other than the ruling yangban class, and some possessed property rights, legal entities and civil rights. Hence, some scholars argue that it is inappropriate to call them "slaves", while some scholars describe them as serfs. Furthermore, the Korean word for an actual slave, in the European and American meaning, is noye, not nobi. Some nobi owned their own nobi.

History

Some people became nobi as legal punishment for committing a crime or failing to pay a debt. However, some people voluntarily became nobi in order to escape crushing poverty during poor harvests and famines.

Household nobi served as personal retainers and domestic servants, and most received a monthly salary that could be supplemented by earnings gained outside regular working hours. Non-resident nobi resided at a distance and were little different than tenant farmers or commoners. They were registered officially as independent family units and possessed their own houses, families, land, and fortunes. Non-resident nobi were far more numerous than household nobi.

The hierarchical relationship between yangban master and nobi was believed to be equivalent to the Confucian hierarchical relationship between ruler and subject, or father and son. Nobi were considered an extension of the master's own body, and an ideology based on patronage and mutual obligation developed. The Annals of King Taejong stated: "The nobi is also a human being like us; therefore, it is reasonable to treat him generously" and "In our country, we love our nobis like a part of our body."

In the chakkae system, nobi were assigned two pieces of agricultural land, with the resulting produce from the first land paid to the master, and the produce from the second land kept by the nobi to consume or sell. In order to gain freedom, nobi could purchase it, earn it through military service, or receive it as a favor from the government.

In 1426, Sejong the Great enacted a law that granted government nobi women 100 days of maternity leave after childbirth, which, in 1430, was lengthened by one month before childbirth. In 1434, Sejong also granted the husbands 30 days of paternity leave.

See also
Yangban
Chungin
Sangmin
Cheonmin

References

External links
Slavery in Traditional Korea (James B. Palais, University of Washington; Theodore Kornweibel, San Diego University) at the Abstracts of the 2000 AAS Annual Meeting (via archive.org)
 Changing Aspects in the Livelihood of Korean Slaves (nobi) in Late Choson Korea (Kuen Tae Kim et al.) at the Abstracts of the 2006 AAS Annual Meeting

Korean caste system
Slavery in Korea
Korean slaves